Dryopteris crassirhizoma is a fern species in the wood fern family Dryopteridaceae.

It has gained the Royal Horticultural Society's Award of Garden Merit. 

The acylphloroglucinols (flavaspidic acids) isolated from D. crassirhizoma show in vitro antibacterial and fatty acid synthase inhibitory activity. Also, the constituents sutchuenoside A and kaempferitrin have in vivo antiparasitic activity.

References 

crassirhizoma
Plants described in 1920
Taxa named by Takenoshin Nakai